Anna Maria Muccioli (born 15 August 1964) is a Sammarinese politician who served as a Captain Regent for a six-month term in 2013 and 2014, with Gian Carlo Capicchioni.

She was previously the capitano (mayor) of Chiesanuova, as she was elected in the 2003 Sammarinese local elections and a member of the Grand and General Council.

References

1964 births
21st-century Italian women politicians
Captains Regent of San Marino
Female heads of government
Female heads of state
Living people
Mayors of places in San Marino
Members of the Grand and General Council
Sammarinese Christian Democratic Party politicians
Sammarinese women in politics
Italian people of Sammarinese descent
Women mayors of places in San Marino